Ephes Dammim, meaning "border of blood," or Pas Dammim is a biblical place name.

Mentioned in the Bible, a place in the tribe of Judah where the Philistines camped when David fought with Goliath (1 Samuel 17:1). Probably so called as having been the scene of frequent bloody conflicts between Israel and the Philistines. Its location has not been identified with any certainty.

References

Hebrew Bible places
Philistines